Luteolinidin is a member of the 3-deoxyanthocyanidins.  It is a cation with ill-defined anions. This orange species that can be found in Sorghum bicolor.

Luteolinidin was shown to inhibit CD38 with relatively high potency compared with previously used inhibitors

Glycosides 
Luteolinidin 5-O-β-D-[3-O-β-D-glucopyranosyl-2-O-acetylglucopyranoside] (a 3-deoxyanthocyanidin
laminaribioside) can be found in the fern Parablechnum novae-zelandiae (syn. Blechnum novae-zelandiae).

See also
 List of compounds with carbon number 15

References

Anthocyanidins
Sorghum
Catechols
Resorcinols